Erich Gerberding (15 Oktober 1921 – 24 May 1986) was a German actor.

After 1945 Gerberding had at first stage engagements in Gera and Heiligenstadt, before becoming for many years an ensemble member of the Municipal Stages of Leipzig. Parallel to his theatre activity he got important character parts in film and television productions.

Roles worth to be pointed out he had in Freispruch mangels Beweises and in the television series Die Flucht aus der Hölle.

Filmography

External links 
 

1921 births
1986 deaths
Actors from Hanover
German male film actors
German male stage actors
German male television actors
20th-century German male actors